Óscar Martínez Diéguez (born 9 March 1974) is a former professional tennis player from Spain and now a coach.

Career
Martinez made his debut on the ATP Tour at the 1994 Casablanca Open, where he defeated two top 100 players, Carl-Uwe Steeb and Franco Davín, en route to a quarter-final appearance. He was runner-up in the 1994 Athens International, beating the second and third seeds, before losing the final to Alberto Berasategui. The Spaniard also reached the quarter-finals in Prague that year.

In 1995, Martinez was a quarter-finalist in Mexico City. He had a win that year over world number 13 Alberto Berasategui in Stuttgart's Mercedes Cup and appeared in two Grand Slam tournaments. In the 1995 French Open he was beaten in the first round by Daniel Vacek and in Wimbledon he lost again in the opening round, to Stefan Edberg.

ATP career finals

Singles: 1 (0–1)

Challenger titles

Singles: (3)

References

1974 births
Living people
Spanish male tennis players
Sportspeople from Valencia
Tennis players from the Valencian Community